Jamaluddin Siddiqui (born 29 March 1950) is an Indian Politicians member of Samajwadi Party. He represented Bhojpur (Assembly constituency) Sixteenth Legislative Assembly of Uttar Pradesh in office 2012 to 2017

References 

1950 births
Living people
Samajwadi Party politicians
Uttar Pradesh politicians
Samajwadi Party politicians from Uttar Pradesh